Osek is a Polish coat of arms. It was used by several szlachta families in the times of the Polish–Lithuanian Commonwealth.

History

Blazon

Notable bearers
Notable bearers of this coat of arms include:

See also
 Polish heraldry
 Heraldry
 Coat of arms

Polish coats of arms